Vidar Benjaminsen (born 18 August 1962) is a Norwegian ski-orienteering competitor and world champion. He has received four gold medals, four silver medals and seven bronze medals at the World Ski Orienteering Championships, from 1986 to 1996. He won the overall World Cup in Ski Orienteering in 1989 and 1993.

After retiring from elite ski-orienteering, he has been an active organizer of events as well as promoter of the sports of orienteering and ski-orienteering. In 2004, he was awarded a prize for his voluntary efforts by Oslo's regional sports administration. 

His club is Lillomarka Orienteering Team. He has been an active member since its formation in 1985.

He is married to Anne Benjaminsen, and they are parents of Andrine Benjaminsen and Juni Marie Benjaminsen.

References

1962 births
Living people
Norwegian orienteers
Male orienteers
Ski-orienteers